Christian Music Planet was a bi-monthly music magazine that was started by Educational Media Foundation (EMF) in 2002. The first issue was published in September/October 2002. The magazine was owned and operated by EMF from 2002 until 2007 when it was sold to Salem Communications Corp. The magazine was headquartered in Rocklin, California. The last issue of Christian Music Planet was published in March/April 2007.

References

Bimonthly magazines published in the United States
Music magazines published in the United States
Christian magazines
Defunct magazines published in the United States
Magazines established in 2002
Magazines disestablished in 2007
Magazines published in California